Michael "Mick" Conlan (born 20 February 1958 in Tasmania, son of Neil Conlan) is a former Australian rules footballer who played in the Victorian Football League (VFL).

Born in Tasmania, Conlan played with the Manuka Football Club in the Australian Capital Territory before being recruited to the VFL by the Fitzroy Football Club. He debuted in 1977 and played mostly at half-forward or in a forward pocket wearing the number 12 guernsey. He was noted for his explosive power, and kicked numerous World of Sport "Goals of the Week", typically on bursting runs down the flanks. His emphasis on strength training and muscular physique pre-empted what was to be more common in later decades. His nicknames were "the Sherman Tank" or "Crash", with his most notable moment being kicking the winning goal during the final seconds in the 1986 Elimination Final against Essendon. He went on to play 210 games for 395 goals with the club until his retirement in 1989 (his final game being for the Reserves in their Premiership win over Geelong that year). During his career he represented Victoria in State of Origin on four occasions. Conlan kicked 10 goals in one game against Footscray in 1984.

After retirement he went on to coach Sandringham Football Club in the Victorian Football Association.

In March 2012 Conlan became the chief executive officer of AFL Queensland.

References 

1958 births
Fitzroy Football Club players
Living people
Victorian State of Origin players
Australian rules footballers from Tasmania
Sandringham Football Club coaches
Manuka Football Club players